The green peafowl or Indonesian peafowl (Pavo muticus) is a peafowl species native to the tropical forests of Southeast Asia and Indochina. It is the national bird of Myanmar. Formerly common throughout Southeast Asia, only a few isolated populations survive within Cambodia (mainly in the northern and eastern provinces) and adjacent areas of Vietnam. It has been listed as endangered on the IUCN Red List since 2009, primarily due to widespread deforestation, agriculture and loss of suitable habitat, severely fragmenting the species' populations and contributing to an overall decline in numbers. Due to their natural beauty, they are still sometimes targeted by the pet trade, feather collectors, and even by hunters for meat. They are a much-desired bird for private and home aviculturists, despite their rather high-maintenance care requirements (when compared to the more common and hardy Indian blue peafowl).

Description

Unlike the related Indian peafowl, the sexes of green peafowl are quite similar in appearance, especially in the wild. Both males and females have long upper-tail coverts (which cover the tail itself, underneath). Outside of the breeding season, however, the male's train is moulted; distinguishing the sexes during this period can be difficult unless they are observed quite up close. The neck and breast feathers (of both sexes) are highly iridescent green and resemble dragon scales. In the male, the scapular, median, and greater wing coverts are blue;  the lesser coverts are green and form a triangle of scaly shoulder feathers (when the wing is closed). The secondaries are black and, in some subspecies, the tertials are brown and/or barred with a faint pattern. The female has blue lesser coverts, and lacks the triangle at the wing-shoulder. Females also have neck scales fringed with copper, as well as more barring on the back, the primaries and alula. Both sexes have shafted crests, are long-legged, heavy-winged, and long-tailed in silhouette. The crest of the female has slightly wider plumes, while those of the male are thinner but taller. The facial skin is double-striped with a whiteish-blue; beside the ear is a yellow-orange crescent. The dark triangle below the eye (towards the eyebrow) is bluish-green in the male, and brown in the female. Seen from a distance, they are generally dark-coloured birds with pale vermillion- or buff-coloured primaries, which are quite visible in their peculiar flight;  this action has been described as a true "flapping" flight, lacking the gliding that one associates with many birds.

Green peafowl are generally more silent than Indian peafowl; the males will announce their presence, from their roost sites, at dawn and dusk. The males of some subspecies (especially P. m. imperator) will call with a loud "ki-wao", which is often repeated. The female has an equally loud "aow-aa" call, with an emphasis on the first syllable. The males may also make a similar sound to the females.

Green peafowl are large birds (amongst the largest living galliformes) in terms of overall size, though rather lighter-bodied than a wild turkey. Green peafowl are, perhaps, the longest extant wild bird in total beak-to-tail length. The tail coverts are even longer than those of the male Indian peafowl, but are shorter than those of the argus pheasant. The green peafowl is capable of sustained (albeit energy-intensive) flight and is often observed on wing.

Distribution and habitat
The green peafowl was widely distributed in Southeast Asia in the past from southern China especially Yunnan, eastern and north-eastern India, southeastern Bangladesh, northern Myanmar, extending through Laos, and Thailand into Vietnam, Cambodia, Peninsular Malaysia, and the island of Java in Indonesia. Records from northeastern India have been questioned and old records are possibly of feral birds. The ranges have reduced with habitat destruction and hunting.

Green peafowl are found in a wide range of habitats, including primary and secondary forest, both tropical and subtropical, as well as evergreen and deciduous. They may also be found amongst bamboo, on grasslands, savannas, scrub, and farmland edge. In Vietnam, the preferred habitat was found to be dry, deciduous forest close to water and away from human disturbance. Proximity to water appears to be an important factor.

Taxonomy

The species was first classified as Pavo muticus by Carl Linnaeus, although it was previously described in Europe by Ulisse Aldrovandi as "Pavo Iaponensis" based on a Japanese painting given to the pope by the emperor of Japan. These birds were depicted as having no spurs; Linnaeus followed Aldrovandi's description. The Japanese had imported green peafowl from Southeast Asia for hundreds of years, and the birds were frequently depicted in Japanese paintings. As a result, the type locality described by Linnaeus was "Habitat in Japonia", though the species is not native to Japan (they were kept by the emperor and no longer occur). François Levaillant was one of the first Western ornithologists to see a live bird, imported from Macau to an animal collection in Cape of Good Hope. From an Indian painting, George Shaw described a peafowl native to India with a "blue head" and an "upright lanceolate crest", which he named Pavo spicifer, the spike-crested peacock. A third form of green peafowl was described in 1949 by Jean Delacour, as P. imperator, found in Indochina. From the advice of a bird dealer in Hong Kong, Delacour concluded there were three races of green peafowl, lumping P. spicifer into the species, as well. Today, most authorities recognise these three:

 Pavo muticus muticus, the Java peafowl (nominate). Extant population endemic to the east and western ends of Java, Indonesia. Extinct populations from the Malay Peninsula from the Kra Isthmus extending south to Kedah have also been described as being synonymous with the Javanese population, but no published studies have confirmed this assumption. Often described as the most colourful of the three subspecies, the neck and breast is a metallic golden-green with cerulean blue wing coverts. Females have prominent barring on the back and tertials.
 P. m. imperator, the Indo-Chinese peafowl. From east Myanmar to Thailand, Yunnan province in China and Indochina, this subspecies is the most common and has the widest distribution. In Thailand, it is currently confined to the Nan, Yom, Eng and Ping river basins in northern Thailand and the Huai Kha Khaeng and Mae Klong basins in western Thailand. In Vietnam, it has become extinct in the northern part of the country, its last large population being confined to the southeast in Yok Đôn and Cát Tiên National Park. imperator is intermediate in colouration between the other two forms.
 P. m. spicifer, the Burmese peafowl. Found in Bangladesh towards southwestern Thailand, formerly also in northern Malaysia. Birds in Northeast India are sometimes considered extinct but are still occasionally sighted. However, sightings have sometimes been questioned as feral or escaped birds. Delacour considered the west and east sides of the Irrawaddy river to be the dividing line between spicifer and imperator respectively. A population of spicifer was reintroduced to Hlawga National Park east of the Irrawaddy river. Sometimes described as "duller" than the other forms, it has a matte gun metal-blue to olive-green neck and breast, and more black on the wing-coverts and outer web of secondaries. The crown of the male is violet-blue which often extends further down the nape than other subspecies, demarcating the colours of the crown and neck.

Delacour dismissed several aberrant specimens to be individual variations (including the type specimens for imperator originating from the Bolaven Plateau in Laos), and stated more subspecies may be recognised with further studies. However, few studies have been conducted to substantiate Delacour's classification, even though it is accepted by nearly all authorities.  Some authors have suggested that the population found in Yunnan, which are traditionally classified as imperator, may be another race. Using the cytochrome b mitochondrial DNA gene, Ouyang et al. estimated the divergence period between green and Indian peafowl to be 3 million years. In the same study, they also noted there appeared to be two different forms of green peafowl in Yunnan which should be classified as distinct subspecies. A 2005 article from The Star newspaper of Malaysia stated that research indicated the Malaysian form to be identical to the Javanese form, but the study was not published and some authors dispute the result. Due to the large range of imperator in Indochina, other subspecies within its range have also been proposed, notably annamensis of Southeast Asia and yunnanensis of Yunnan.

Behaviour and ecology

The green peafowl is a forest bird which nests on the ground laying 3 to 6 eggs.

It has been widely believed that the green peafowl is polygynous, but unlike the Indian peafowl, males are solitary and do not display in leks. Instead the solitary males are highly territorial and form harems with no pair bonds.

However, the theory that the male is polygymous also conflicts with observations in captivity; pairs left alone with no human interaction have been observed to be strongly monogamous. The close similarity between both sexes also suggests a different breeding system in contrast to that of the Indian peafowl. Thus, some authors have suggested that the harems seen in the field are juvenile birds and that males are not promiscuous.

They usually spend time on or near the ground in tall grasses and sedges. The diet consists mainly of fruits, invertebrates, reptiles, frogs and rodents. As with the other member of its genus, the green peafowl can even hunt venomous snakes. Ticks and termites, flower petals, buds, leaves and berries are favorite foods of the adult peafowl.

Status
Due to hunting and a reduction in extent and quality of habitat, as well as poaching, the green peafowl is evaluated as endangered on the IUCN Red List of Threatened Species. It is listed on Appendix II of CITES. The world population has declined rapidly and the species no longer occurs in many areas of its past distribution. The last strongholds for the species are in protected areas such as Huai Kha Khaeng Wildlife Sanctuary in Thailand, Cat Tien National Park in Vietnam and Baluran National Park, Ujung Kulon National Park in Java, Indonesia. The population in the wild was estimated to be about 5,000 to 10,000 individuals around 1995. In Cambodia, Keo Seima Wildlife Sanctuary was shown to hold a significant and increasing population of around 745 individuals in 2020.

Although there is no natural range overlap with the Indian peafowl, hybridisation is still a threat where the Indian peafowl is introduced as they produce fertile hybrids. In captivity hybrids are called "Spalding" peafowl and are used by breeders to create different breeds. Through backcrossing some hybrids become almost indistinguishable from pure green peafowl. As the species as a whole is sometimes called "Java peafowl" in aviculture, the subspecies of green peafowl are also mixed in captivity and there are many captive birds of unknown provenance. In some areas of their native range, captive green peafowl have sometimes been released in the vicinity of a breeding station even though their true origins remain unknown.

In 2005, The Star reported that successful reintroductions were being made in Malaysia by the World Pheasant Association (WPA). The article stated that the genetic research proved the Javan and Malay peafowl were genetically identical and the subspecies muticus was introduced - the scientific community consensus. However, the assumption that the Malaysian and Javanese muticus birds are the same subspecies remains controversial, so it is uncertain which subspecies was introduced. Since the 2005 article, there has been no update on the status of the reintroduction.

Cultural significance

The green peafowl is often depicted in Japanese paintings from the Edo period, notably by Maruyama Ōkyo and Nagasawa Rosetsu.

The Peacock Room, a room installation painted between 1876–77 by James McNeill Whistler now located in the Freer Gallery of Art in Washington, D.C., prominently features paintings of green peafowl.

Although the Burmese or grey peacock-pheasant is the national bird of Myanmar, the green peafowl was an ancient symbol of the monarchs of Burma. It was also shown during British colonial times on the flag of the governor and the naval ensign, as well as on the flag of the State of Burma from 1943–1945 and on the currency of independent Burma as well.

References

External links

Arkive images and movies of the green peafowl (Pavo muticus)
The Green Peafowl of Thailand

Green peafowl (Pavo muticus) at gbwf.org

Articles containing video clips
green peafowl
green peafowl
Birds of Southeast Asia
Birds of Yunnan
Endangered animals
Endangered biota of Asia
green peafowl
Birds of Myanmar